The 2019–20 Premier League of Belize was the ninth season of the Premier League of Belize, the highest competitive football league in Belize, after it was founded in 2011. There were two seasons which were spread over two years.

Teams

Opening season

From the 2018–19 Premier League of Belize closing season, 7 teams continued to play in the opening season of 2019–20, with Placencia Assassins returning to the league to replace Police United. Freedom Fighters were also rebranded to Valley Pride Freedom Fighters and relocated to Dangriga from Punta Gorda.

There would be one league consisting of the 8 teams, who will play each other twice, with the top 4 teams advancing to the end of season playoffs. The opening season commenced on 27 July 2019.

League table

Results

Playoffs

Semifinals 

Game One

Game Two

Finals 

Game One

Game Two

Season statistics

Top scorers

 Includes playoff goals.

Hat-tricks

Awards

At an awards ceremony on 4 January 2020, the individual awards were announced.

Closing season

7 of the 8 teams that participated in the opening season will participate in the closing season, with Valley Pride Freedom Fighters not competing, as they were unable to meet their commitments.

The format will be the same as the opening season with one league consisting of the 7 teams, who will play each other twice, with the top 4 teams advancing to the end of season playoffs. The closing season commenced on 11 January 2020.

On 18 April 2020 a virtual meeting was held by the Premier League of Belize, and it was unanimously agreed by club owners to cancel the remainder of the closing season due to the uncertainty of the COVID-19 pandemic. The league also stated that the safety of players, officials, fans and stakeholders had to be taken into consideration. It was also agreed that Verdes would represent Belize at the 2020 CONCACAF League. According to the league, the decision to allow Verdes to represent Belize was based on the fact that the club had won the 2019–20 opening season, and was the aggregate point leader with a total of 51 points at the initial juncture, when the season was suspended.

League table

Results

Season statistics

Top scorers

Hat-tricks

References

Top level Belizean football league seasons
1
Belize
Belize